The Portland Thunder (originally Portland Storm) was an American football team in the World Football League based out of Portland, Oregon.  When the World Football League was created in October 1973, the Storm was the original New York franchise.  When the Boston Bulls merged with New York to become the New York Stars, the original New York entry's draft picks were eventually relocated to Portland.  They were the first major league football team based in Portland. They played at then Civic Stadium, now known as Providence Park.

Portland's original owner, Houston accountant John Rooney, soon dropped out of the picture.  By March 1974, Bruce Gelker, a former football player and owner of several Saddleback Inns, was named the new owner of the fledgling team.  Gelker originally sought a team in Mexico City, which proved to be unfeasible.  After approaching officials in Salt Lake City, he settled on Portland.  The Storm hired Ron Mix, a Pro Football Hall of Famer, as general manager and Dick Coury, an NFL assistant with the Denver Broncos, as head coach.  Before the season, Canadian businessman Robert Harris bought a controlling interest, but Gelker stayed on as team president.

The Storm was the last WFL team to be organized, and as a result had mostly rookies on their roster.  Among the standouts was running back Rufus "Roadrunner" Ferguson, ex-CFL and Detroit Lion quarterback Greg Barton, and linebackers coach Marty Schottenheimer (later a successful head coach in the NFL) and Bruce Bergey, brother of Cincinnati Bengals-Philadelphia Eagles linebacker Bill Bergey.

In the first half of the season Portland played poorly, going 2-7-1.  The Storm won their first game when they beat Detroit in the ninth week.  Originally a Wheels home game, the contest was moved to London, Ontario. The team improved during the second half of the season, thanks in part to several NFL players cut during training camp that September.  Among the new signings were Ben Davidson of the Oakland Raiders, and Pete Beathard, who had been cut by the Kansas City Chiefs.  With the stock of veterans, the Storm won six of their final 10 games.  One of those wins was a 26–21 upset of the powerful Birmingham Americans.

The team was in trouble off the field as well.  They only drew 14,000 fans per game.  Additionally, an onerous lease with Civic Stadium rapidly drained the team of cash.  By the middle of the season, Harris was so short on cash that he persuaded the Detroit Wheels to move their game to his hometown of London, Ontario.  The players went the last few games without being paid, and reportedly they had to depend on sympathetic fans for food.  They were forced to move their final home game, against the Florida Blazers, to the road due to the poor attendance, and only played after Harris guaranteed them $50,000.  The money never arrived.

The team finished the season with an overall record of 7-12-1, tied with Houston-Shreveport for 8th place in the 12-team league and seemingly qualifying them for the playoffs.  However, league officials decided to reduce the playoff field to six teams—without telling anyone with the Storm.  Soon after, the IRS slapped a $168,000 lien on the franchise.

The Portland Thunder took the Storm's place in 1975 and lasted until the entire WFL folded halfway through their second season. The Thunder's office in downtown closed in October 1975.

In 2013, the Arena Football League expanded into Portland, as the Portland Thunder, making many recall the Storm/Thunder.

Schedule and results

1974 regular season

1975 regular season

See also
 1974 World Football League season
 1975 World Football League season
 Portland Breakers

References

External links
Thunder on Fun While It Lasted
1975 team page
Thunder logo

 

Storm
1973 establishments in Oregon
Defunct American football teams in Oregon
1975 disestablishments in Oregon